Pirapat Watthanasetsiri (also known as Earth, born 23 February 1994) is a Thai actor. He is known for his main roles as Waii in Water Boyy: The Series (2017) and So in Kiss Me Again (2018). His fame further skyrocketed through his titular role as Chief Phupha in the widely-successful television series A Tale of Thousand Stars with Sahaphap Wongratch.

Early life and education 
Pirapat was born in Bangkok, Thailand. He graduated in 2018 with a bachelor's degree in performing arts from the Faculty of Fine Arts at Srinakharinwirot University.

Filmography

Television

Music video appearances

Short Film

Awards and nominations

Discography

References

External links 
 
 

1994 births
Living people
Pirapat Watthanasetsiri
Pirapat Watthanasetsiri
Pirapat Watthanasetsiri
Pirapat Watthanasetsiri
Pirapat Watthanasetsiri